Commercial Court is a type of specialized court on commercial law.

List of existing commercial courts 
 Commercial Court (Belgium)
 Commercial Court (England and Wales)
 Commercial Court (Victoria)
 Tribunal de commerce

Courts by type
Business law